Nikolay Sokolov or Sokoloff may refer to:
Nikolai Sokoloff (1886–1965), Russian-American conductor and violinist
Nikolai Alekseyevich Sokolov (born 1983), Russian football striker
Nikolay Sokolov (composer) (1859–1922), Russian composer 
Nikolay Sokolov (runner) (1930–2009), Soviet Olympic athlete
Nikolai Sokolov (footballer) (1897–1988), Soviet international football goalkeeper
Nikolai Stepanovich Sokolov, fictional character from the Metal Gear series

See also
Sokolov (disambiguation)